Saint-Aulaye is a former commune in Dordogne, France. On 1 January 2016, it was merged into the new commune Saint-Aulaye-Puymangou.
Jeanne Baret, the first woman to travel round the world, retired to Saint-Aulaye, where she died in 1807.

Population

See also
Communes of the Dordogne department

References

Former communes of Dordogne
Angoumois